Xanthomycin A is an antibiotic with in vitro antitumor activity isolated from Streptomyces.

References

Tetracycline antibiotics